= List of consuls general of Turkey to Palestine =

This list of consuls general of Turkey to Palestine provides a chronological record of individuals who have served as the diplomatic representatives of the Republic of Turkey to the State of Palestine. Some sources refer to the consul general as if they are an ambassador.

== List of consuls general ==
Consul-General	Term start	Term end	Ref.
Hasan Basri Lostar	24 June 1925	17 March 1927	
Mehmet Refik Durmaz	17 March 1927	30 June 1928	
Atıf Kor	20 July 1928	22 November 1930	
Hasan Sabri Kezrak	12 April 1931	31 August 1931	
Rüşemi Bey	9 September 1931	30 May 1932	
Talat Kayaalp Bey	6 July 1932	4 December 1934	
Ahmed Umar	7 December 1934	24 July 1938	
Cemal Tevfik Karasapan	25 July 1938	16 April 1942	
Hilmi Kamil Bayur	9 May 1942	10 August 1943	
Fuad Aktan	25 September 1943	13 July 1945	
Ahmet Rüştü Demirel	12 October 1945	31 July 1949	
Burhan Işın	25 November 1949	18 February 1951	
Fuat Bayramoğlu	19 February 1951	9 September 1953	
Hakkı Kentli	29 November 1953	13 July 1959	
Sadullah Eygi	21 February 1961	25 March 1961	
Kemal Yurdadoğan	25 March 1961	18 September 1961	
Celalettin Ziyal	19 September 1961	15 October 1964	
Halil Kaya Pirnar	15 October 1964	2 September 1966	
Ali Refik İleri	3 September 1966	15 July 1971	
Behiç Kışınbay	27 July 1971	17 August 1975	
Aydın Alacakaptan	31 August 1975	16 October 1977	
Yusuf Kadri Dicle	31 October 1977	7 July 1978	
Işık Akın (UZER)	1 October 1992	17 August 1996	
Ethem Tokdemir	1 September 1996	16 August 2000	
Hüseyin Avni Bıçaklı	1 September 2000	13 February 2005	
Ercan Özer	15 February 2005	12 November 2009	
Şakir Özkan Torunlar	17 April 2010	1 February 2014	
Hüsnü Gürcan Türkoğlu	15 November 2016	15 June 2019	
